Kavi Karnapura or Kavikarnapura (born as Parmananda Sen) was a 16th-century Indian Bengali poet in Sanskrit; best known for verse works, Chaitanya Charanamrita (Mahakavya) and Chaitanya Chandrodaya (Nataka). He was a junior contemporary of Chaitanya Mahaprabhu.

Life and works
Kavi Karnapura was born as (Paramananda Sen) the son of Shivananda Sen, a Vaidya and a prominent disciple of Chaitanya. He was born on 1524 in Nadia district of Bengal, about a decade before Chaitanya's passing in 1533 and met Chaitanya several times in Puri and was received the honorific title of 'Kavi Karnapura' ('he 'who adern the poets' ears') by Chaitanya. He was spent his last days at Vrindavan.

He has written extensively on the life and teaching of Chaitanya and on the faith of bhakti movement. These include the 'Mahakavya' and 'Nataka' referred to earlier, Alamkara-Kaustubha (on devotional sentiments), Gaura-ganoddesha-dipika (Hagiology), Ananda -Vrindavana-Champa (Interpretation of Krishnalila) and a commentary on the Srimad Bhagavat. Karnapura sought to systematize the faith within a theoretical framework.

References 

Indian male poets
16th-century Indian poets
Bengali Hindu saints
1524 births
Bengali poets
Poets from West Bengal